Sergio Casal and Emilio Sánchez were the defending champions, but lost in the first round this year.

Vincent Spadea and Christo van Rensburg won the title, defeating Jiří Novák and David Rikl 6–3, 6–3 in the final.

Seeds

  Luis Lobo /  Javier Sánchez (quarterfinals)
  Tomás Carbonell /  Francisco Roig (semifinals)
  Sergio Casal /  Emilio Sánchez (first round)
  Jiří Novák /  David Rikl (final)

Draw

Draw

References
Main Draw

ATP Buenos Aires
1995 ATP Tour
ATP